Clematis vitalba (also known as old man's beard and traveller's joy) is a shrub of the family Ranunculaceae.

Description
Clematis vitalba is a climbing shrub with branched, grooved stems, deciduous leaves, and scented greeny-white flowers with fluffy underlying sepals. The many fruits formed in each inflorescence have long silky appendages which, seen together, give the characteristic appearance of old man's beard. The grooves along the stems of C. vitalba can easily be felt when handling the plant.

This species is eaten by the larvae of a wide range of moths. This includes many species which are reliant on it as their sole foodplant; including small emerald, small waved umber and Haworth's pug.

Range
C. vitalba has a preference for base rich alkaline soils and moist climate with warm summers. The species is native to Eurasia and North Africa.

United Kingdom
In the UK it is a native plant and is common throughout England south of a line from the River Mersey and the River Humber. It also commonly occurs in southern, Eastern and northern Wales. Outside of these areas it is widely planted and occurs as far north as the southern highlands of Scotland.

As an invasive species
Due to its disseminatory reproductive system, vitality, and climbing behavior, Clematis vitalba is an invasive plant in many places. Some new tree plantations can be suffocated by a thick layer of Clematis vitalba, if not checked. The species is capable of rapid growth, climbing several times faster than English ivy, and each plant may produce in excess of 100,000 seeds. The plant may also spread through stem and root fragmentation.

New Zealand

In New Zealand it is declared an "unwanted organism" and is listed in the National Pest Plant Accord. It cannot be sold, propagated or distributed.  It is a potential threat to native plants since it grows vigorously and forms a canopy which smothers all other plants and has no natural controlling organisms in New Zealand. New Zealand native species of Clematis have smooth stems and can easily be differentiated from C. vitalba by touch.

North America
In the North America, old man's beard is considered an invasive species. It is found in Washington, Oregon, California, and British Columbia. The species is also found in the eastern United States. The species was introduced as an ornamental plant in the Pacific Northwest sometime between 1950 and 1970.

Characteristics
Reproductive organs:
 Inflorescence type: biparous cyme
 Sex:  hermaphrodite
 Type of pollination:  entomophilous
Seed:
 Type of fruit:  achene
 Dissemination:  With the wind
Habitat and distribution:
 Type of habitat: Mid-European shrubberies, mountainsides, in moderately eutrophic regions
 Distribution: Holarctic

Diseases
C. vitalba suffers from tomato spotted wilt virus.

Use
Clematis vitalba was used to make rope during the Stone Age in Switzerland. In Slovenia, the stems of the plant were used for weaving baskets for onions and also for binding crops. It was particularly useful for binding sheaves of grain because mice do not gnaw on it. In Italy, the sprouts are harvested to make omelettes (called "vitalbini" in Tuscany, "visoni" in Veneto).

Gallery

References

External links

Global Invasive Species Database - Clematis vitalba
Traveller's joy at  Bioimages.org
Traveller's joy by Regional Burgas Museum Clematis vitalba in Bulgaria

vitalba
Flora of Europe
Flora of England
Flora of the United Kingdom
Medicinal plants of Europe
Plants described in 1753
Taxa named by Carl Linnaeus